Itaqui is a municipality in Brazil, located in the southwestern part of the state of Rio Grande do Sul, close to the Argentinian border, between Uruguaiana and São Borja. It sits at a mean altitude of 57 meters (187 ft), by the Uruguay River. Its population is currently estimated at 37,489.

Geography 

The municipality contains part of the  São Donato Biological Reserve, a strictly protected conservation unit created in 1975 that protects an area of wetlands on the Butuí River, a tributary of the Uruguay River.

Politics

The city's first mayor was Felipe Nery de Aguiar, (1896–1900).

History 

The city's inhabitant demonym is Itaquiense / Gaúcho.
The city's patron saint is Saint Patrick.

Arts

Theater Prezewodowski History

Theatro Prezewodowski, or Teatro Prezewodowski, was built in 1883 and is one of the oldest in South America.   It is constructed of masonry, with a façade 15 meters high—an important characteristic being the mobile auditorium, which, with a special mechanism, puts the main floor level with the stage, for balls and other types of events.  The façade above the main entrance is decorated with an entrance porch with two Roman columns.  Windows are on either side of this main entrance on the ground and first floor levels, and the first floor has two doors with fences of iron.

The name of the Theater is a hommage to Estanisláo Przewodowski, who fought in the Paraguayan War (1864–1870) and was of Polish-descendant, (he was born in Bahia) and then leader of the Flotilla of the High, Uruguay River, unit of the Brazilian Navy, that was anchored here in the waters of the Uruguay River in Itaqui, during approximately 40 years.  The Prezewodowski Theater is situated in front of the "Square Marshal Deodoro da Fonseca" and at the side of the Municipal City hall.

During many years the theater had been the scene of stage plays of great international theatrical companies, that played in Brazil, in the axis Porto Alegre-São Paulo-Rio de Janeiro, and then going on to Buenos Aires and Montevideo.  Due to the ease of the river travel, these European companies always played in Itaqui's Theater, giving to the city the nickname of "Small Paris."  Not only the foreign companies were attractions at the Theater, the biggest names of the Brazilian stage also have played in it, such as Prócopio Ferreira, Maria de La Costa, Nicete Bruno, Wilson Grey, Vicente Celestino and others famous artists from Teatro Municipal (Rio de Janeiro).

With the advent of the Second World War, that prevented the coming of theatrical companies to Brazil, the Theater went into decay.

The city administered the Theater until 1928, when the cinematographic entrepreneur Manoel Barbosa leased it monthly for R$350,000 réis.  In 1931, it was leased to another entrepreneur, Mr. Eduardo Corbacho for the equivalent 10% of the incomes of the spectacles, with a minimum guarantee of R$300,000 réis.  In 1933 the company Contursi & Cia leased it for the monthly value of R$600,000 réis, with the obligation to make it function at least four times per month, on condition that solo artists or the city's artists played in it.

In 1942, the building was sold at public auction, as a result of an action moved by a shareholder, who desired to recover the value of capital that she had subscribed. The building was bought in the auction by the city's medic and politician Dr. Roque Degrazia, who later, for the same price that he had paid, sold it on to the city's administration, which is still today the owner of its patrimony.

Economy

Agriculture
Itaqui is the second largest rice producer of the state, and CAMIL INC. is the largest rice producer of Latin America. It uses the brand name of CAMIL in rice, soya oil and beans that it produces. The company was created in Itaqui in the 60s, and has expanded its operations to São Paulo, Uruguay and the city of Camaquã and Maçambara.

Together with Itaqui's branch, JOSAPAR INC., from the city of Pelotas, it is the producer of 'TIO JOÃO' brand name rice and is the 2nd major rice industry of Latin America.

References

The 2002's book "ITAQUI", by Iara Maria Pazetto Rossi.
The photo "Sundown at Uruguai River seen from the Port of Itaqui/RS" was shot by Belmiro Elói Bittencourt da Rosa on 24-apr-2005 05:40.

External links

English
 The Jesuit Missions (REDUCCIONES) in South America.
 The Jesuit Missions in South America
 Cirque du Soleil – Helen Ball, Cinthia Beranek, Raquel Karro, Susanna Defraia Scalas, Zoey Tedstill, and Stella Umeh performed their serpentine-like gyrations on a trapeze ...
  Raquel Karro's Photo

Portuguese

 Itaqui - 1° R.C.MEC. – First Regiment of Mechanized Cavalry
 Itaqui – New and old photos of Itaqui 
 Composer and writer João Sampaio
 Composer and singer Elton Saldanha
  Cattle and rice
 The Italians of Itaqui, text by Manoelito de Ornellas Manoelito de Ornellas
 O mensário "Cruz Alta em Revista" publica, em 1929, "Chico: um conto de Natal" que, por insistência do jornalista Prado Júnior, Erico havia consentido. O colega de boticário e escritor Manoelito de Ornellas envia ao editor da "Revista do Globo", em Porto Alegre, os contos "Ladrão de gado" e "A tragédia dum homem gordo", onde, aprovadas, foram publicadas. 
  1913,  Lendas do Sul by J. Simões Lopes Neto (in Portuguese)
 Movimento Tradionalista Gaúcho 
  Página do Gaúcho
  Teatro Prezewodowski de 1883
 Rádio Cruzeiro do Sul – AM – 3am until 9pm GMT 
 Rádio Pitangueira – AM 
 Rádio Pitangueira – FM 
 Rádio Liberdade – FM 

Municipalities in Rio Grande do Sul
Uruguay River